
This is a list of sieges, land and naval battles of the French invasion of Russia (24 June – 14 December 1812).

See also 
 Attrition warfare against Napoleon
 Lists of battles of the French Revolutionary Wars and Napoleonic Wars
 List of battles of the War of the First Coalition
 List of battles of the War of the Second Coalition
 List of battles of the War of the Third Coalition
 List of battles of the War of the Fourth Coalition
 List of battles of the War of the Fifth Coalition
 List of battles of the War of the Sixth Coalition
 List of battles of the Hundred Days (War of the Seventh Coalition)
 Order of battle of the French invasion of Russia
 Russian Army order of battle (1812)
 Timeline of the Finnish War

Notes

References

Bibliography
 
 

French invasion of Russia